Parvarish is a 2014 Pakistani television series. It started on 23 September 2014 and ended on 17 March 2015. It is written by Momina Khursheed Ali. It is produced by Ironline productions. It is directed by Mohsin Mirza.

It stars Azfar Rehman, Anum Fayyaz, Sidra Batool, Babar Khan and Saba Faisal in lead roles.

Soundtrack

Music
Parvarish theme song is sung by Beena Khan. Parvarish theme song lyrics are written by Sahir Ali Bagga. The opening theme and ending theme is Apni Parvarish.

Track listing

Cast
Azfar Rehman as Raafeh
 Anum Fayyaz as Noor-ul-Ain
 Sidra Batool as Isbah
 Babar Khan as Babar
 Saba Faisal as Dilawaiz, Raafeh and Babar's mother
 Firdous Jamal as Ibrahim, Raafeh and Babar's father
 Jinaan Hussain as Sundas
 Naveed Raza as Rameez
 Mehmood Akhtar as Isbah's father
 Seemi Pasha as Isbah's mother
 Farah Nadir as Noor's step mother
 Shahzad Raza as Noor's father
 Aasiya Amjad as Natasha

External links
 
  ARY tutorial

Pakistani television series
ARY Digital original programming
Urdu-language television shows
2014 Pakistani television series debuts
2015 Pakistani television series endings